Hydrocharitales is a botanical name of an order of flowering plants.  A well-known system that used this name is the Cronquist system (1981), for an order in subclass Alismatidae, with this circumscription: 

 order Hydrocharitales
 family Hydrocharitaceae

The APG II system, used here, assigns most of the plants involved to the expanded order Alismatales, in the clade monocots.

Historically recognized angiosperm orders